P. Unnikrishnan (9 July 1966) is an Indian Carnatic vocalist and film playback singer. Best known for his work in Tamil films and other South Indian language films, Unnikrishnan has recorded over 4000 songs. He has also recorded songs for many non-film albums, tele-series, devotionals and classical collaborations.

Unnikrishnan shot to fame with his debut film song "Ennavale" composed by A. R. Rahman for the film Kadhalan (1994). He fetched the National Film Award for Best Male Playback Singer for the song shared with his another solo "Uyirum Neeye" from the film Pavithra (1994), again composed by A. R. Rahman. Since then, Unnikrishnan has recorded thousands of film songs for various prominent South Indian music composers such as Ilaiyaraja, Vidyasagar, M. M. Keeravani, Sirpy, S. A. Rajkumar, Deva, Hamsalekha, Mani Sharma, Koti, Yuvan Shankar Raja, Karthik Raja, Harris Jayaraj, Bharadwaj and others.

Recorded film songs 
This is only a partial list; Unnikrishnan has sung over 4000 songs in Tamil, Kannada, Telugu and Malayalam.

Tamil film songs

1990s

2000s

2010s

Telugu songs

1990s

2000s

2010s

2020s

Kannada songs

1990s

2000s

2010s

Malayalam songs

Hindi songs

Serial songs

References

Unnikrishnan, P